Emmeric Ong Yu Min (born 25 January 1991) is a Singaporean professional footballer who plays as a defender for Singapore Premier League club Balestier Khalsa and the Singapore national team.

Club career

Hougang United 
Ong got his break in the S.League when he was still registered as a Prime league player with Hougang United in 2011.

Courts Young Lions 
Commanding a starting spot and impressing the coaches, Ong caught the eyes of the national youth setup. He then moved to Courts Young Lions as part of the Sea Games Preliminary Squad during the mid season transfer window. National Service commitments meant that Ong was ruled out of the Sea Games and was enlisted to the Army on 3 November 2011. Subsequent years followed in the S.League with the Courts Young Lions, however, appearances were limited due to NS commitments. In 2013, Ong was reunited with then 2011 Hougang United coach Aide Iskandar. He then started the season as first choice centre back for the Courts Young Lions, making 7 appearances before suffering an ACL injury and was ruled out of the season.

LionsXII 
Ong signed for MSL side LionsXII for the 2014 season. However, despite being a regular sight on the bench, Ong only managed a solitary appearance for the LionsXII, in a Malaysia Cup match, for the entire season.

Warriors FC 
Ong signed for S.League Champions Warriors FC for the 2015 S.League season after failing to make any appearances for the LionsXII in the 2014 Malaysian Super League. He made just a single Malaysia Cup appearance on the last day of the season. In 2015, Ong was signed by the reigning S.League Champions Warriors FC and looked to provide cover in defence for the champions. He did not feature in the match day squad for the first two league games of the season and remained on the bench for their AFC Champions league qualifier against Yadanarbon FC. However, things took a turn when Ong was given a run out in their 2-0 loss to Maldivian side Maziya FC and impressed coach Alex Weaver. He then came off their bench against Albirex Niigata FC in their next league game, started their following AFC cup game against Bengaluru FC and never looked back. Ong began to hold down a starting role in the team and kept experienced and foreign players such as Shi Jiayi and Thomas Beattie out of the side. He filled in at right back when needed but was mostly utilised as a holding midfielder. In December 2015, Ong signed on to stay at the Warriors for the 2016 S.League season.

His performances in the 2017 Singapore League Cup, in which the Warriors finished as runners-up, saw him earn a spot in Fourfourtwo's League Cup team of the year. 2017 proved to be a good year for Ong as he was a mainstay in the team throughout the season, with the club announcing on Facebook that Ong had been retained for the 2018 S.League season.

Tanjong Pager United 
In 2021, Ong signed for Tanjong Pagar United.

Balestier Khalsa 
On 16 January 2023, Ong signed for Balestier Khalsa.

International career
Although he was just a backup player in the LionsXII squad, Ong was called up to the Singapore Under-21 team for the Hassanal Bolkiah Trophy, one of the much-respected Southeast Asian youth tournaments.

In 2017, Ong was called up to the national team for the friendly against Hong Kong and the 2019 Asian Cup Qualifiers against Turkmenistan on 31 August and 5 September respectively. He made his debut and started the game against Hong Kong but was red carded in the 87th minute.

Career Statistics

Club
. Caps and goals may not be correct.

 Young Lions and LionsXII are ineligible for qualification to AFC competitions in their respective leagues.
 Young Lions withdrew from the Singapore Cup and Singapore League Cup in 2011 due to scheduled participation in the 2011 AFF U-23 Youth Championship.

International

International caps

Honours

Warriors FC 
 Charity Shield: 2015

References

External links 
 

Living people
1991 births
Singaporean footballers
Singapore international footballers
Singaporean sportspeople of Chinese descent
Association football defenders
Hougang United FC players
Warriors FC players
LionsXII players
Singapore Premier League players
Young Lions FC players